The 1987 National Professional Soccer League was won by Vaal Professionals.

References

1987
1987 in South African sport
1987–88 in African association football leagues